The 1962 Tipperary Senior Hurling Championship was the 72nd staging of the Tipperary Senior Hurling Championship since its establishment by the Tipperary County Board in 1887.

Thurles Sarsfields were the defending champions.

On  14 October 1962, Thurles Sarsfields won the championship after a 1-07 to 1-06 defeat of Moycarkey-Borris in the final at Thurles Sportsfield. It was their 24th championship title overall and their second title in succession.

Results

Final

References

Tipperary
Tipperary Senior Hurling Championship